Sagarmatha Engineering College (SEC) (Nepali: सगरमाथा  इन्जिनियरीङ कलेज), affiliated to Tribhuvan University, Nepal, is an engineering college in Sanepa, Lalitpur, Nepal. Sagarmatha Engineering College  provides bachelor's degree courses: Computer engineering, Electronics and information Engineering and Civil engineering.

History

Sagarmatha Engineering College was established in 2010 under the affiliation of Tribhuvan University.

Departments
There are three departments:
Department of Civil Engineering.
Department of Computer Engineering.
Department of  Electronics and Information.

See also 
 List of universities and colleges in Nepal
Tribhuvan University

References

External links
Official website

Lalitpur District, Nepal
Engineering universities and colleges in Nepal
Tribhuvan University
Science and technology in Nepal
Educational institutions established in 2010
2010 establishments in Nepal